Väinö Hakkarainen (2 May 1932 – 17 April 2009) was a Finnish wrestler. He competed in the men's freestyle lightweight at the 1956 Summer Olympics.

References

External links
 

1932 births
2009 deaths
Finnish male sport wrestlers
Olympic wrestlers of Finland
Wrestlers at the 1956 Summer Olympics
People from Kotka
Sportspeople from Kymenlaakso